Napoleon Township may refer to the following places in the United States:

 Napoleon Township, Michigan
 Napoleon Township, Henry County, Ohio